Lü Yang (born 26 November 1993) is a Chinese rower. She competed in the women's double sculls event at the 2016 Summer Olympics.

On 28 July 2021, she and three teammates won the gold medal in women's quadruple sculls at the 2020 Summer Olympics in Tokyo with 6:05.13, setting the new WB. It was the second time that China won the Olympic gold medal in the event.

References

External links

1993 births
Living people
Chinese female rowers
Olympic rowers of China
Rowers at the 2016 Summer Olympics
Rowers at the 2020 Summer Olympics
People from Luohe
Asian Games medalists in rowing
Rowers at the 2014 Asian Games
Asian Games gold medalists for China
Medalists at the 2014 Asian Games
World Rowing Championships medalists for China
Medalists at the 2020 Summer Olympics
Olympic gold medalists for China
Olympic medalists in rowing
20th-century Chinese women
21st-century Chinese women